Zabuthiri Township is one of Naypyidaw Union Territory's eight townships, located south of Mandalay Region in Burma.

History
Zabuthiri Township was formed from part of Mandalay Division's Lewe and Pyinmana Townships.

Zabuthiri is derived from Pali , and literally means "splendor of the rose apple."

Demographics

2014

The 2014 Myanmar Census reported that Zabuthiri Township had a population of 110,459. The population density was 1,659.4 people per km2. The census reported that the median age was 29.3 years, and 87 males per 100 females. There were 26,320 households; the mean household size was 3.5.

References

Naypyidaw